Bentinck located at  is a cadastral parish in Kennedy County New South Wales.

Bentinck Parish is rural land between Albert, New South Wales and Tullamore, New South Wales and is on what was Wiradjuri traditional land.

References

Parishes of Kennedy County